The Pécs TV Tower is a television tower in Pécs, Hungary, standing on the Misina peak of Mecsek (535 meters), measuring 197 metres, the tallest building in Hungary, with a publicly accessible observation deck at a height of 75 metres, and a restaurant at 72 metres. The tower was built from 1968 to 1973. There is a dinosaur exhibition at the restaurant level, with two life-sized dinosaur mock-ups, depicting the once native Komlosaurus.

External links 
 https://web.archive.org/web/20081225073417/http://www.vendegvaro.hu/Tv-torony-Pecs

Towers in Hungary
Towers completed in 1973
Buildings and structures in Pécs
Tourist attractions in Pécs